Jijo Punnoose is an Indian film director, producer and actor from Kerala. He is best known for directing the two landmark films in Malayalam cinemaPadayottam (1982) and My Dear Kuttichathan (1984). He is the eldest son of producer Navodaya Appachan. Jijo directed Padayottam was the first indigenously shot 70mm film in India, and My Dear Kuttichathan is the first 3D film in India.

Career

Padayottam was a wide canvas film produced by Navodaya Appachan. The story was inspired from the novel The Count of Monte Cristo. It was the first indigenously shot 70mm film in India. In 1984, he directed My Dear Kuttichathan, India's first 3D film.

Filmography

References

External links 

Malayalam film directors
Living people
Film directors from Kerala
20th-century Indian film directors
20th-century Indian male actors
Male actors in Malayalam cinema
Male actors in Malayalam television
Indian male film actors
Indian male television actors
People from Alappuzha district
Directors who won the Best Children's Film National Film Award
Year of birth missing (living people)
Filmmaking pioneers
Odia film directors